This is a discography for the American vocalist and bassist Justin Pearson.

Struggle

Compilation albums

Extended plays

Split extended plays

Swing Kids

Compilation albums

Extended plays

Split extended plays

Singles

Other appearances

The Locust

The Crimson Curse

Compilation albums

Extended plays

Split extended plays

Holy Molar

Some Girls

Albums

Studio albums

Compilation albums

Extended plays

Music videos 
 "I Need Drugs" (2005)
 "Bone Metal" (2006)
 "Deathface" (2007)

Head Wound City

Studio albums

Extended plays

Singles

All Leather

Retox

Studio albums

Extended plays

Split extended plays

Music videos 
 "A Bastard On Father's Day" (2011)
 "Biological Process of Politics" (2013)
 "Let's Not Keep in Touch" (2015)
 "Without Money, We'd All Be Rich" (2015)
 "Die In Your Own Cathedral" (2015)

Dead Cross

Studio albums

Music videos

Planet B

References 

Pearson, Justin
Discographies of American artists